Guri is an Indian singer and actor associated with Punjabi music and Punjabi cinema. He Known predominantly for his songs like Billian Billian, Yaar Beli, Mil Lo Na, and Nirra Ishq. He made his debut as an actor with the movie "Sikander 2".

Career

As a singer 
Guri made his debut in singing with song "Yaar Beli". Later he released songs like "Jimmy choo choo", "Dooriyan", "Mil Lo Na", "Chootey Maatey", "Jatti" and "Bewafa Tu". Which became commercial hits in Punjabi music industry.
 His song "Nira Ishq" also appeared in 2019 Apple Music India charts and song "Jatti" appeared in 2019 Gaana' top 50 punjabi songs list.

As an actor 
In 2019, Guri made his acting debut with movie "Sikander 2".

In 2022, He acted as lead character in film Jatt Brothers with Jass Manak. He again played lead role in the film Lover, in the same year.

Filmography

References

External links 

Guri on Hungama.com

Living people
Punjabi-language singers
Indian singers
Actors from Punjab, India
Indian actors
1993 births